Tillandsia leucolepis is a species of flowering plant in the genus Tillandsia. This species is endemic to Mexico.

Cultivars
 Tillandsia 'Mayan Gold'

References

BSI Cultivar Registry Retrieved 11 October 2009

leucolepis
Flora of Mexico